Traymore station could refer to:

 Traymore station (PAAC), a disused light rail station in Pittsburgh, Pennsylvania
 Traymore station (Reading Railroad), a disused train station in Bucks County, Pennsylvania